Kamiki (written: 上木 or 神木) is a Japanese surname. Notable people with the surname include:

, Japanese singer-songwriter
, Japanese actor and voice actor

Japanese-language surnames